Qarluq (also Romanized as Qārlūq and Qarlūq; also known as Karluk, Qārloq, and Qārlūk) is a village in Qareh Poshtelu-e Bala Rural District, Qareh Poshtelu District, Zanjan County, Zanjan Province, Iran. At the 2006 census, its population was 152, in 27 families.

References 

Populated places in Zanjan County